JoAnn Sprung (died 2022) was an American bridge player. She won a World Championship in 2010. She lost in the final of the McConnell Cup in 1994 and reached the semi-final stage of the same event at the 1998 World Championship in Lille, France.

Bridge accomplishments

Wins
 World Mixed Teams Championship (1) 2010 
 North American Bridge Championships (6)
 Freeman Mixed Board-a-Match (1) 1980 
 Rockwell Mixed Pairs (2) 1990, 1991 
 Wagar Women's Knockout Teams (2) 1994, 2004 
 Machlin Women's Swiss Teams  (1) 2004

Runners-up
 McConnell Cup (1) 1994
 North American Bridge Championships (8)
 Machlin Women's Swiss Teams  (2) 1982, 2005 
 Keohane North American Swiss Teams (1) 1994 
 Sternberg Women's Board-a-Match Teams  (3) 1996, 2004, 2007 
 Whitehead Women's Pairs (1) 2003 
 NABC+ Mixed Swiss Teams (1) 2019

Personal life
JoAnn was married twice. First to Ed Manfield from 1980-1985 and then to Danny Sprung.

References

External links
 

American contract bridge players